William Jermaine Stewart (September 7, 1957 – March 17, 1997) was an American R&B singer, best known for his 1986 hit single "We Don't Have to Take Our Clothes Off", which peaked at number five on the Billboard Hot 100. It also peaked within the top ten of the charts in Canada at number two, the Republic of Ireland, and the United Kingdom. He is also well known for his 1987 song "Say It Again", which reached number 7 in the UK.

Early life and Career
William Jermaine Stewart was born in Columbus, Ohio, to Ethel and Eugene Stewart. In 1972, his family moved to Chicago, Illinois, where Stewart took his first steps toward a career in entertainment. Eventually, he gained recognition as a dancer on the locally produced television show Soul Train. While working there he befriended two other Soul Train dancers, fellow Chicagoan Jody Watley and Jeffrey Daniel. After Soul Train relocated to Los Angeles, the three friends auditioned to become members of the group Shalamar, which was put together by Soul Train creator Don Cornelius and booking agent Dick Griffey. Watley and Daniel were selected for the group as backup/semi-lead vocalists, and Stewart lost out to Gary Mumford during his audition for lead vocalist. However, Stewart toured with the new group as a dancer for several years, and while in London for a show, he met Mikey Craig of Culture Club. Realizing that Stewart was a talented singer, Craig helped him in putting together a demo tape, and Stewart was given the opportunity to sing background vocals on Culture Club's song "Miss Me Blind". As a result of the combination of a strong demo and his ties with Culture Club, he landed a recording contract with Arista Records.

Stewart saw some success with the single "The Word Is Out" from the album of the same name. The album peaked at number 90 on the US Billboard 200 albums chart, and number 30 on the US R&B Albums chart. Stewart's next album was 1986's Frantic Romantic, which included the Billboard Hot 100 top ten song "We Don't Have to Take Our Clothes Off". The song was a global hit, peaking within the top ten of the charts in Canada, the Republic of Ireland, and the United Kingdom. A second single, "Jody", was released, the inspiration being his friend Jody Watley, which reached the US R&B top twenty. Frantic Romantic would be Stewart's most successful selling album, peaking at number 34 in the US.

In 1987, he appeared in the video "Never Say Never" by Deniece Williams.

Stewart's third album was entitled Say It Again, with production handled largely by André Cymone. Supported by international live dates with his band The Party, the title track "Say It Again" became Stewart's second US Top 40 Billboard hit, and also reached the US R&B Top 10. In the UK Singles Chart it reached number 7, which helped the album achieve its Top 40 status.

The next three singles were all remixed by Phil Harding. "Get Lucky" (UK No. 13), "Don't Talk Dirty to Me" (UK No. 61), and "Is It Really Love?" found success in Europe, particularly in Germany, where "Don't Talk Dirty to Me" was one of the top five selling singles of 1988.

"They all charted and did really well," recalled Harding of the remixed tracks. "There was barely a brief [from the record company], beyond, 'Do your thing guys.' And then it was us taking the assumption, that since the PWL sound is all over the radio, let's make it more PWL."

Stewart's fourth and final album under contract with Arista Records was What Becomes a Legend Most. The album failed to make an impact in America while the lead single "Tren de Amor" just reached the top 100 in the UK. "Tren de Amor" was featured on the soundtrack to the movie She Devil. In 1989, Stewart sang "Hot and Cold", co-written by Andy Summers, which was featured over the opening credits of the film Weekend at Bernie's. "Hot and Cold" was released as a single on 7" as well as cassette, the single includes "Search for Love" which is the first appearance of this song written by Stewart and Roy Carter, it was later released as "Search" on the "Is It Really Love?" single.

In 1991, Stewart teamed up with Chicago producer Jesse Saunders for his last recorded work, an album for Reprise Records, Set Me Free. The title track "Set Me Free" was released as a single in the US, but sold poorly. The album remained unreleased as of 2021.

Shortly before his death, Stewart returned to the studio to record a new album titled Believe in Me. Although the album was not completed, the finished tracks were released on the 2005 compilation Attention: A Tribute to Jermaine Stewart, which was released under BFG Records (which is owned by Stewart's brother).

The 2007 song "Clothes Off!!" by Gym Class Heroes interpolated Stewart's signature song "We Don't Have to Take Our Clothes Off". On October 18, 2010, Cherry Red Records re-issued his album Frantic Romantic on CD for the first time since 1986. It includes bonus tracks, most notable of which are the 12" mixes of "Jody" and "Dance Floor", making their CD debut.

In 2011, the song "We Don't Have to Take Our Clothes Off" was used in a Cadbury advertisement in the UK called 'The Charity Shop'. This exposed the song to a new generation who downloaded the track, and returned it to the UK Singles Chart peaking at No. 29.

Personal life and death
Stewart was openly gay. He died of AIDS-related liver cancer on March 17, 1997, at age 39 in the Chicago suburb of Homewood, Illinois. His burial site was left without a tombstone or even a grave marker for over 17 years. In 2014, his grave finally received a gravestone, paid for anonymously by a fan.

Discography

Albums

Singles

References

External links
 
 
 
 

1957 births
1997 deaths
American dance musicians
American gay musicians
American male dancers
American male pop singers
AIDS-related deaths in Illinois
Singer-songwriters from Ohio
Singers from Chicago
Musicians from Columbus, Ohio
Deaths from cancer in Illinois
Deaths from liver cancer
American contemporary R&B singers
20th-century American dancers
African-American male singer-songwriters
20th-century African-American male singers
Singer-songwriters from Illinois
LGBT people from Illinois
LGBT people from Ohio